Kaszó is a village in Somogy county, Hungary. It was first mentioned in 1398. The village is popular with hunters, due to wildlife in the surrounding areas.

A small church stands in Darvaspuszta, an area belonging to Kaszó.

External links 
 Street map (Hungarian)

References 

Populated places in Somogy County